Salford City Council elections are generally held three years out of every four, with a third of the council being elected each time. Salford City Council is the local authority for the metropolitan borough of Salford in Greater Manchester, England. Since the last boundary changes in 2020, 60 councillors have been elected from 20 wards.

Political control
From 1889 to 1974 Salford was a county borough, independent of any county council. Under the Local Government Act 1972 it had its territory enlarged and became a metropolitan borough, with Greater Manchester County Council providing county-level services. The first election to the reconstituted city council was held in 1973, initially operating as a shadow authority before coming into its revised powers on 1 April 1974. Greater Manchester County Council was abolished in 1986 and Salford became a unitary authority. The Labour Party has held a majority of the seats on the city council since the reforms of 1974:

Leadership

Prior to 2012, political leadership was provided by the leader of the council. The leaders from 1974 to 2012 were:

In 2012 the council changed to having a directly elected mayor. The mayors since 2012 have been:

Council elections
1998
1999
2000
2002
2003
2004 (boundary changes took place for this election)
2006
2007
2008
2010
2011
2012
2014
2015
2016
2018
2019
2021 (boundary changes took place for this election)
2022

Borough result maps

By-election results

May 1996 to May 1998

May 2000 to May 2002

May 2004 to May 2006

May 2008 to May 2010

May 2010 to May 2011

May 2011 to May 2012

May 2012 to May 2014 

Election followed the death of Councillor Janet Rochford (Labour).

Election followed the death of Councillor Norbert Potter (Labour).

May 2016 to May 2018 

Election followed the death of Councillor Harry Davies (Labour).

Election follows the resignation of Councillor Sareda Dirir (Labour).

Election followed the death of Councillor Joe Murphy (Labour).

Election followed the death of Councillor Paul Longshaw (Labour).

May 2018 to May 2019 

Election followed the resignation of Councillor Peter Wheeler (Labour).

May 2021 to May 2022 

 
 
 

Election followed the death of Councillor Raymond Walker (Labour).

References

 By-election results

External links
Salford City Council

 
Local government in Salford

Council elections in Greater Manchester
Salford